Grove House is a Grade II* listed building at 100 High Street, Hampton in the London Borough of Richmond upon Thames. It dates from the late 17th century and in 1669 was called Brick House. Subsequently enlarged and remodelled, it was converted into offices in 1966.

Former residents include Sir Archibald Edmonstone, 1st Baronet, Sir Charles Edmonstone, 2nd Baronet, Edward Lapidge, Samuel Shuker and Charles James Stutfield.

See also

Grade II* listed buildings in Richmond upon Thames

References

Further reading
Heath, G D. Hampton in the nineteenth century, Borough of Twickenham Local History Society Paper No. 27, 1973; second edition 1993
Heath, G D. A Chronicle of Hampton 1956–1981, Hampton Residents’ Association, 1981 

1600s establishments in England
17th-century architecture in England
17th-century establishments in England
Grade II* listed buildings in the London Borough of Richmond upon Thames
Hampton, London
Office buildings in London